Denag (Middle Persian: Dēnag) was a 3rd-century Sasanian queen (banbishn), who was the wife and sister of the Sasanian king (shah) Ardashir I.

Biography 
She was one of the daughters of Pabag, a local ruler in Pars; her brothers were Shapur, Ardashir I, and Balash. She later became the wife of Ardashir I in accordance with the Zoroastrian law of  consanguine marriage. She was thus given the title of bānbishnān bānbishn ("Queen of Queens") and is assumed to have been represented the figure on the far right of the investiture relief of Ardashir at Naqsh-e Rajab. She later lost her title of bānbishnān bānbishn after the death of her husband in 242.

References

Sources 
 

3rd-century Iranian people
3rd-century deaths
Sasanian queens
3rd-century women
Sasanian princesses